Camel (in rhythmic landscape with trees) (German: Kamel (in rhythmischer baumlandschaft)) is a painting by Swiss artist Paul Klee, made in 1920, in the collection of the Kunstsammlung Nordrhein-Westfalen in Düsseldorf, Germany.

The painting is one of the first Klee did in oils and is typical of the artist's interest in colour theory, draughtsmanship and musicality. It is also one of many images in Western art to use camels as subject matter.

The composition of the painting is based on horizontal bands dotted with circular shapes.

Subject
Camels appear in manuscripts, mosaics, sculptures and paintings. For example, camels and horses appear in illustrations to the travel memoir of John Mandeville in the fourteenth century. Orientalist paintings of the nineteenth century include ones by artists such as Carl Haag (Danger in the Desert, 1867) and Jean-Léon Gérôme (Street Scene, Egypt, 1869). The memorial on the Victoria Embankment Gardens in London commemorates the Imperial Camel Corps in sculpture.

The year before, Klee had produced another camel painting in oils entitled Two Camels and a Donkey (1919). Camel in Rhythmic Landscape with Trees is considered one of a series that includes Rhythmic Tree Landscape. Similar landscapes, such as Small Rhythmic Landscape were also created at this time.

Context and theory

This is the period when the artist was working and teaching at the Bauhaus in Weimar under the direction of Walter Gropius. The task of teaching caused Klee to meditate on the problems of art and as a result he produced what Herbert Read called "the most profound and illuminating statement of the aesthetic basis of the modern movement in art ever made by a practising artist".

See also
List of works by Paul Klee

References

Further reading 
 Kudielka, Robert (2002) Paul Klee: the nature of creation, works 1914-1940,  London: Hayward Gallery; Aldershot, Hants; Burlington, VT: Lund Humphries 
  Schmalenbach, Werner (1986) Paul Klee: the Düsseldorf Collection  [translated from the German by Michael Foster]  Munich: Prestel-Verlag; New York, N.Y.

External links

1920 paintings
Landscape paintings
Paintings by Paul Klee
Paintings in Düsseldorf
Camels in art